Jens Petter Antonsen (born 2 August 1963) is a Norwegian musician (trumpet), known studio musician from a large number of recordings and television shows. He is the son of bandleader Odd R. Antonsen, and brother of musicians Ole Edvard and Tom Erik Antonsen.

Biography 
Antonsen has played in numerous bands, like Mezzoforte, Chipahua, Vinni, Paperboys, Madcon, Karpe diem, 
Alejandro Fujentes, Soulslave, Dance With a Stranger, Jon Balke "Magnetic North", Mrs.Robinson, Jahn Teigen, Jens Wendelboe's Crazy energy (Vol 1, 1991), Oslo 13 og 1300 Oslo.  Morten Halle's oktett, i Soul Inc, as well as the studio band Horns for Hire (recipients of the 2006 Gammleng-prisen).

Discography

Antonsen Big Band 
 Antonsen Big Band (2007)

Chipahua 
 The Soul Survivors (1984)

Oslo 13 
 Live (1993)

1300 Oslo 
 Live in the North (2001)

Other collaborations 
 Odd R. Antonsen Symphonic Band: Janitsjarsvisker Vol. 1 (1982)
 Brødrene Dal: Spektralplate (1982)
 Lava: Prime Time (1982)
 Amund Enger: Hvis jeg… (1983)
 The Monroes: Sunday People (1983)
 New Jordal Swingers: Movin’ On (1984)
 Øystein Sunde: I Husbukkens tegn (1984)
 Bobbysocks: Bobbysocks (1984)
 Arnold Børud: Balladen om Jesus – Rock-opera av Arnold Børud (1984)
 Lava: Fire (1985)
 Cirkus Modern: Trøst (1985)
 Banana Airlines: Vi kommer snart på hjem (1985)
 Bobbysocks: Bobbysocks (1985)
 Jan Harrington: Soularium (1985)
 Lars Mjøen & Knut Lystad: Perler for svin (1985)
 Anita Skorgan: Karma (1985)
 Lillebjørn Nilsen: Hilsen Nilsen (1985)
 Lava: Prime Cuts (1985)
 Hans Inge Fagervik: Drømma og karneval (1985)
 Øystein Sunde: Overbuljongterningpakkmesterassistent (1986)
 3 Busserulls: Det glade vanvidd (1986)
 Pål Thowsen: Call Me Stranger (1986)
 Diverse: Drømmeslottet (1986)
 Øistein Boassen & Morten Halle: Blackout – Original Soundtrack From the Feature Film (1986)
 Kate: The Beauty and the Beat (1987)
 Steinar Ofsdal: Kalender (1987)
 Sigvart Dagsland: De umulige (1987)
 Viggo Sandvik: Fisking i Valdres (1988)
 Egil Eldøen: Egil Eldøen (1988)
 Banana Airlines: Banana Airlines flyr igjen (1988)
 Maj Britt Andersen: Folk er rare! 2! (1988)
 Finn Kalvik: Livets lyse side (1988)
 Busserulls: Hi-ha! Jo galare, jo bedre! (1988)
 Solfrid Hoff: Prinsessa i tårnet (1988)
 Øystein Sunde: Kjekt å ha (1989)
 Jan Bang: Frozen Feelings (1989)
 Steinar Ofsdal: Vestenfor måne (1990)
 Private Eye: Private Eye (1990)
 Bjørn Jens: Cappucino (1990)
 Maj Britt Andersen: Tamme erter & villbringebær (1990)
 Bjørn Eidsvåg: Tatt av vinden (1990)
 Børudgjengen: Virkeligst av alt (1990)
 Dag Kolsrud: December (1990)
 Odd R. Antonsen Symphonic Band: The Man with the Horn (1991)
 Jens Wendelboe: Big Crazy Energy Band, Vol. 1 (1991)
 Dag Kolsrud: December II (1991)
 Eli Rygg & Birgit Strøm: Julestri og adventstid hos Eli og Teodor (1991)
 Ole Paus: Biggles' testamente (1992)
 Jannicke: World of Wisdom (1992)
 Ole Edvard Antonsen: Tour De Force (1992)
 Backstreet Girls: Let's Have It (1992)
 Eriksen: Two Blue (1992)
 Knut Værnes Band: Roneo (1993)
 B-Flat: (Flow) (1993)
 Mulens Portland Combo: Blå stikke (1993)
 Catwalk: Checkin' Out of Line/Alibi (1993)
 The Last James: The Last James (1993)
 Reflex: Denne dagen (1993)
 Mezzoforte: Daybreak (1993)
 Jon Balke & Magnetic North Orchestra: Further (1994)
 Jens Wendelboe: Big Crazy Energy Band, Vol. 2 (1994)
 Maj Britt Andersen: Rippel Rappel (1994)
 Dance with a Stranger: Unplugged (1994)
 Guys in Disguise: Guys in Disguise (1994)
 Øystein Sunde: Du må'kke komme her og komme her (1994)
 Anita Skorgan: Julenatt (1994)
 Oslo Gospel Choir: Tusen julelys (1994)
 Oslo Gospel Choir: The Christmas Way (1994)
 Jan Rohde: A New Side of Jan Rohde (1995)
 Odd R. Antonsen Big Band: Feelin' Free (1995)
 Øivind Blunck & Tom Mathisen: Mysteriet med den falske bonden (1995)
 Mulens Portland Combo: Tired of the Blues (1995)
 Halle * Eberson * Kjellemyr * Thowsen: The Eagle (1995)
 Bjørn Jens: Rastløst blod (1996)
 Steinar Albrigtsen: Life Is Good (1996)
 Odd Børretzen & Anita Skorgan: Våre beste barnesanger (1996)
 Vazelina Bilopphøggers: Hææærli' på toppen ta væla (1996)
 Frode Alnæs: Frode (1996)
 Bugge Wesseltoft: New Conception of Jazz (1996)
 Ole Edvard Antonsen: Read My Lips (1997)
 Helge Iberg: Never Ending "West Side" Story (1997)
 Torbjørn Sunde: Meridians (1998)
 Ola Slaaen & Regn: Heart to Heart (1998)
 Stig Rossen: Julelys (1998)
 Oslo Gospel Choir: Julenatt (1998)
 Øivind Blunck: Fridtjofs helaften (1999)
 Oslo Gospel Choir med Calvin Bridges: Power (1999)
 POD: Organic (2000)
 D.D.E.: Jippi (2000)
 Ole Edvard Antonsen & TrondheimSolistene: New Sound of Baroque (2000)
 Vazelina Bilopphøggers: Hjulkalender (2000)
 New Jordal Swingers: Indigo (2001)
 Haldor Lægreid: On My Own (2001)
 Trøste & Bære: Med promp og prakt (2001)
 Torbjørn Sunde: Where is the Chet (2001)
 Miki N'Doye Orchestra: Joko (2002)
 New Jordal Swingers: Belfast Cowboy (2002)
 Diverse: Gyldne takter og toner (2002)
 Lava: Polarity (2003)
 Jan Werner: Singer of Songs (2003)
 Kor-90: The Soul of Christmas (2003)
 Halvdan Sivertsen: Frelsesarmeens Juleplate (2003)
 New Jordal Swingers: 45 Beste! (30 år med rock’n’roll) (2004)
 Paperboys: Wiggle It (2004)
 Chicas del Coro: Seven Days on the Road (2004)
 Seppo: Retrofeelia (2004)
 Paperboys: Tomorrow (2005)
 Paperboys: Keep It Cool (2005)
 Happiness Choir Project: Loveletter to God (2005)
 Paperboys: When Worlds Collide (2005)
 Øystein Sunde: Sundes verden (2006)
 De Dresserte Elger: Året rundt (2006)
 Øystein Sunde: Sundes verden – 52 av de aller beste (2006)
 Paperboys: So Far – So Good (2006)
 El Axel: Showtime (Move Your Arms) (2006)
 Endre Dåvøy and Øystein Lund Olafsen: Nye bryllupsmarsjer (2006)
 El Axel: It Is Wha It Is (2007)
 Dance with a Stranger: Everyone Needs a Friend… The Very Best of Dance with a Stranger (2007)
 Jan Werner: Eg veit i himmelrik ei borg – Frelsesarmeens Juleplate 2007 (2007)
 Maria Haukaas Storeng: Hold On Be Strong (2008)
 Diverse: Dansefestivalen Sel 2008 (2008)
 Diverse: De beste fra Uhu! (2008)
 Kor-90: Time For Peace (2008)
 Ole Børud: Shakin' the Ground (2008)
 Mezzoforte: Live in Reykjavik (2008)
 Bugge Wesseltoft: New Conceptions of Jazz Box (2008)
 Benedicte Adrian: Desember (2008)
 John Ivar Bye: Intakt (2009)
 Vagabond: Vagabond (2009)
 Paperboys: The Oslo Agreement (2009)
 Elisabeth Andreassen and Rein Alexander: Julenatt (2009)
 Bobbysocks: Let It Swing – The Best of Bobbysocks (2010)
 SwingLett: Spinning Wheel (2010)
 Ole Børud: Keep Movin (2011)
 Jan Groth: Mine julesanger (2011)
 Jon Balke: Magnetic Works 1993–2001 (2012)
 Vidar Busk: Paid My Way (2013)
 Eric «Slim» Zahl & the South West Swingers: Chances Are Slim (2013)
 Norsk Utflukt: Long Distance Call (2013)
 New Jordal Swingers: 11 sanger (2014)
 Oslo Gospel Choir: I Go to the Rock (2014)
 Ole Børud: Stepping Up (2014)
 Christiansen: I Wanna Know Ya (2015)
 Åge Aleksandersen and Sambandet: Det e langt å gå til Royal Albert Hall (2016)
 Freddy Dahl: Never (2016)

References 

20th-century Norwegian trumpeters
21st-century Norwegian trumpeters
Norwegian jazz trumpeters
Male trumpeters
Norwegian Academy of Music alumni
1963 births
Musicians from Hamar
Living people
20th-century Norwegian male musicians
21st-century Norwegian male musicians
Male jazz musicians
1300 Oslo members